Copper Creek (also called the Copper River, natively called Chwuloq'e, for chinook salmon) is a southern tributary of the Klamath River in the U.S. state of California. Historically, Copper Creek was the site of at least one Hupa Native American village, then was extensively mined for gold in the 1850s. The origin of the name comes from the peach-colored cliffs that line the lower few miles of the canyon.

Course
It rises as two forks in the Six Rivers National Forest in Trinity County; the West Fork is the larger of the two branches.

From the confluence, Copper Creek proceeds to flow north-northwest, looping to the southeast at the confluence with Basin Creek. It then turns north again, meandering through a relatively straight valley, and receives in quick succession Graham Creek and Lost Cow Creek from the right. At the confluence with Indian Creek, the creek swings northwest, crossing the Humboldt County line and looping along the east flank of Salmon Mountain. The Klamath flows a further  to empty into the Pacific Ocean.

History
Historically, the Hupa tribe lived along Copper Creek and the Klamath River around the area of the Copper's mouth. The river was called Chwuloq'e, meaning chinook salmon. One Hupa village was located on the creek, within  of the mouth. The river received its modern name in 1851 when miners attracted by the California Gold Rush found the river while traveling on the Klamath in search of gold. The copper-colored cliffs that line the last few miles of the creek's canyon inspired them to give the stream its present name. The miners eventually employed hydraulic mining in order to find deeper deposits of gold in the hillsides surrounding the river. This practice severely hurt the ecology of the creek and its salmon run.

See also
List of rivers of California

Works cited

References

Tributaries of the Klamath River
Rivers of Humboldt County, California
Rivers of Trinity County, California
Rivers of Northern California